Hernán is a Spanish, Nahuatl, and Maya language historical drama streaming television series co-produced by Televisión Azteca, Dopamine, and Onza Entertainment that became available for streaming worldwide on Amazon Prime Video on 21 November 2019, except in the United States, and it will subsequently premiere on 22 November 2019 on History in Latin America, and later on TV Azteca on 24 November 2019 in Mexico. The first season consists of 8 episodes, and a second season has been confirmed, which will begin filming in January 2020. The series planned its premiere as part of the 500th anniversary of the Fall of Tenochtitlan and revolves around Hernán Cortés (Óscar Jaenada) from his arrival at the Mexican coast until the defeat of the Mexicas.

A+E Networks International agreed to globally distribute the series in November 2019.

Cast
Part of the cast was confirmed on October 15, 2019, by the newspaper El Imparcial.
 Óscar Jaenada as Hernán Cortes
 Dagoberto Gama as Moctezuma Xocoyotzin
 Ishbel Bautista as La Malinche
 Jorge Antonio Guerrero as Xicotencatl
 Mitzi Mabel Cadena as Doña Luisa
 Michel Brown as Pedro de Alvarado
 Víctor Clavijo as Cristóbal de Olid
 Almagro San Miguel as Gonzalo de Sandoval
 Miguel Ángel Amor as Bernal Díaz del Castillo
 Isabel Luna as Mictecacihuatl

Episodes

Awards and nominations

|-
| align = "center" | 2020 || 29th Actors and Actresses Union Awards || Best Actor in an International Production || Óscar Jaenada ||  || 
|-
| rowspan = 2 align = "center" | 2021 || rowspan = 2 | 8th  || colspan = 2 | Best Miniseries ||  || align = "center" rowspan = "2" | 
|-
| Best Screenplay || Julián de Tavira, María Jaén, Amaya Muruzabal, Curro Royo || 
|}

References

External links

2019 Spanish television series debuts
2019 Spanish television series endings
2019 Mexican television series debuts
2019 Mexican television series endings
2010s Spanish drama television series
2010s Mexican drama television series
Spanish-language television shows
Spanish-language Amazon Prime Video original programming
TV Azteca telenovelas
Amazon Prime Video original programming
History (American TV channel) original programming
Television series by Onza